Ashleigh Kate McConnell,  (born 26 March 1996) is a limb deficient Paralympic swimmer of Australia. She represented Australia at the 2016 Rio Paralympics and the 2020 Tokyo Paralympics, where she won gold medals in freestyle relay events.

Personal
McConnell was born on 26 March 1996 in Melbourne, Victoria. She was born without her left forearm and left hand. She attended Sunbury College. In 2015, she was studying Business at Royal Melbourne Institute of Technology.

Career
McConnell started swimming at the age of four. She is classified as a S9 swimmer. She narrowly missed out on making the 2014 Commonwealth Games and 2014 Pan Pacific Swimming Championships. At the 2015 IPC Swimming World Championships in Glasgow, Scotland, she won a gold medal in the Women's 4 × 100 m Freestyle Relay 34 points.

At the 2016 Summer Paralympics, McConnell won the gold medal in the Women's 4 × 100 m Freestyle Relay 34 points and competed in three additional freestyle events.

At the 2018 Commonwealth Games on the Gold Coast, McConnell won the bronze medal in the Women's 100m Backstroke S9.

At the 2020 Tokyo Paralympics, McConnell, together with her team of Emily Beecroft, Ellie Cole, and Isabella Vincent won a silver medal in the Women's 4x100m Freestyle 34 pts with a time of 4:26.82, two seconds behind the winners, Italy. She also qualified for the final of the Women's 100 m freestyle S9 where she finished sixth.

At the 2022 Commonwealth Games, Birmingham, England, she finished 4th in the Women's 100 m freestyle S9. 

McConnell's motto is "You can't put a limit on anything. The more you dream, the further you get".

Recognition
In 2016, with Para swimmer Monique Murphy, McConnell was named RMIT's Female Athlete of the Year.

McConnell was awarded the Medal of the Order of Australia in 2017.

References

External links
 
 
 

1996 births
Amputee category Paralympic competitors
Female Paralympic swimmers of Australia
Living people
Sportswomen from Victoria (Australia)
Swimmers at the 2016 Summer Paralympics
Swimmers at the 2020 Summer Paralympics
Paralympic gold medalists for Australia
Medalists at the 2016 Summer Paralympics
Medalists at the 2020 Summer Paralympics
Recipients of the Medal of the Order of Australia
Commonwealth Games medallists in swimming
Commonwealth Games bronze medallists for Australia
Swimmers at the 2018 Commonwealth Games
Swimmers at the 2022 Commonwealth Games
Medalists at the World Para Swimming Championships
Paralympic medalists in swimming
Australian female freestyle swimmers
S9-classified Paralympic swimmers
Medallists at the 2018 Commonwealth Games